The Cafehorn is a musical instrument created by classical musician Nicola Gomirato.

Created in July 2006 with the support of the Italian artisans G&P and patented by Nicola Gomirato, it is a strange and unique instrument made of six caffettiera and a brass pipe. It can be played like any other brass instrument since it has a pipe at the end as a mouthpiece.

The Cafehorn can produce warm and charming sounds. Its voice is brilliant like a trumpet and passionate like a French horn.
There is only one cafehorn in the world.

"This is a strange and funny instrument that enchanted hundreds of people when played," said a coffeeshop owner who displayed a Cafehorn in his shop for 15 days in 2007.

Concerts 
The first concert for cafehorn and piano was performed In Grado Italy at the Grand Hotel Fonzari in September 2006. 
Several concerts for solo cafehorn, cafehorn and piano and cafehorn and brass ensemble solo have been made.

References 

Aerophones